Rodeghiero is an Italian surname. It may refer to
Christiano Rodeghiero (1915–?), Italian cross-country skier
Rizzieri Rodeghiero (1919–1996), Italian cross-country skier, brother of Christiano
Roberta Rodeghiero (born 1990), Italian figure skater
Vanni Rodeghiero (born 1942), Italian javelin thrower

See also 

 Rodighiero
 Rodríguez (surname)
 Rodrigues (surname)